Ingrid de Oliveira (born 7 May 1996) is a Brazilian competitive diver. She competed in the 10 metre platform, individual, and synchronized events at the 2015 Pan American Games and 2015 World Aquatics Championships, and won a silver medal in the synchronized event at the Pan American Games. She qualified in both events for the  2016 Summer Olympics.

She represented Brazil at the 2020 Summer Olympics.  Her overall ranking after dives 1 though 5 were 10, 7, 8, 14 and 24, respectively.

References

External links
 
 
 

1996 births
Living people
Brazilian female divers
Olympic divers of Brazil
Divers at the 2014 Summer Youth Olympics
Divers at the 2016 Summer Olympics
Pan American Games silver medalists for Brazil
Pan American Games medalists in diving
Divers at the 2015 Pan American Games
Divers at the 2019 Pan American Games
Medalists at the 2015 Pan American Games
Divers at the 2020 Summer Olympics
Sportspeople from Rio de Janeiro (city)
21st-century Brazilian women